Force Fed is the debut album by American metal band Prong. The album was recorded in November 1988 and released in 1989. Drummer Ted Parsons co-wrote some of the songs for the first time.

The CD version included two bonus tracks, the cover of Chrome's "Third from the Sun" and "Mind the Gap", originally taken from Prong's 1989 EP Third from the Sun (also known as 3). Although the EP is no longer available, Prong still regularly performs "Third from the Sun".

Track listing
"Freezer Burn" – 2:33 (Tommy Victor)
"Forgery" – 1:52 (Mike Kirkland)
"Senseless Abuse" – 3:18 (Ted Parsons, Victor)
"Primitive Origins" – 3:23 (Victor)
"Aggravated Condition" – 2:52 (Victor)
"The Coliseum" – 2:33 (Parsons, Victor)
"Decay" – 2:44 (Kirkland, Victor)
"It's Been Decided" – 2:18 (Kirkland)
"Force Fed" – 2:48 (Prong)
"The Taming" – 1:47 (James, Kirkland)
"Bought and Sold" - 3:16 (Kirkland, Victor)
"Look Up at the Sun" – 3:07 (Prong)
"Drainpipe" – 2:20 (Victor)
"Third from the Sun" (bonus CD re-issue track; Chrome cover)
"Mind the Gap" (bonus CD re-issue track) (Kirkland)

Personnel
Tommy Victor – vocals, guitar
Ted Parsons – drums
Mike Kirkland – bass

References

External links

Prong (band) albums
1989 debut albums